Henry Hardwick Dawson FRIBA (23 February 1900 - 14 January 1962) was an architect based in Nottingham.

Architectural career
He worked in partnership with Alfred John Thraves until that partnership was dissolved in 1927.

Personal life
He was born on 23 February 1900 in Mansfield, Nottinghamshire, the son of Albert Henry Dawson (1868-1954), an LMS Railway Official, and Frances Mary Hardwick (1872-1949). In 1939 he was living with his parents at The Park, Normanton on the Wolds, Nottinghamshire.

He married Marie Leila Gormley in 1943.

He died on 14 January 1962 leaving an estate valued at £13,280.

Works
Palais de Danse, Nottingham 1924-25 (with Alfred John Thraves)
Houses on Queens Drive, Beeston 1932-35 (built by the Ideal Homes Development Company)
Barton Bus Company Offices, 61 High Road, Chilwell 1934
Galaxy Cinema, 37 Derby Road, Long Eaton 1934-35 (rebuilding)
Belfry screen, St Mary's Church, Plumtree, Nottinghamshire 1937
Sunday School, Osmaston Methodist Church, Derby 1937
Field Lane Estate, Alvaston ca. 1938
Barton Bus Company Headquarters, 270-276 Huntingdon Street, Nottingham 1939 Grade II listed.
Houses in Southdale Road, Carlton, Nottingham. ca. 1950
Clifton Methodist Church, Rivergreen, Clifton, Nottingham 1957-58

References

1900 births
1928 deaths
British architects
Architects from Nottingham
Fellows of the Royal Institute of British Architects